Roderick Charles MacDonald (November 1885 – September 18, 1978) was a Scottish-born merchant and political figure in British Columbia. He represented Dewdney in the Legislative Assembly of British Columbia from 1941 to 1952 as a Conservative.

He was born in North Uist, the son of Malcolm MacDonald and Mary A. MacAulay, and was educated there. He came to Canada in 1907, settling in Coquitlam. In 1915, MacDonald married D. E. Wiltshire. He was a member of the Coquitlam council, also serving as reeve from 1924 to 1941 and as president of the Union of British Columbia Municipalities. MacDonald served in the provincial cabinet as Minister of Mines and Minister of Municipal Affairs. He was defeated when he ran for reelection in 1952. MacDonald died in New Westminster at the age of 92.

R. C. MacDonald Elementary School in Coquitlam was named in his honour.

References 

His grandfather was Roderick MacDonald born 1811–12. Died 1881, Hosta North Uist,  son of John (Iaian), son of Roderick. His grandmother was Marion (Mary) MacDonald daughter of Malcolm the miller from Gerrin Mill, North Uist. Marion born 1814 died 1883 Hosta, North Uist.

1885 births
1978 deaths
British Columbia Conservative Party MLAs
British emigrants to Canada